'Sligo was a constituency represented in the Irish House of Commons until 1800.

Members of Parliament
1613–1615 Henry Andrews and Edward Southworth
1634–1635 Arthur Jones and Edward Southworth
1639–1645 Keane O'Hara and Thomas Radcliffe (expelled)
1661–1666 Sir Henry Tichborne and Samuel Bathurst

1689–1801

References

Historic constituencies in County Sligo
Constituencies of the Parliament of Ireland (pre-1801)
1800 disestablishments in Ireland
Constituencies disestablished in 1800